Thiorhodococcus fuscus is a Gram-negative, moderately halophilic and photoautotrophic bacterium from the genus of Thiorhodococcus which has been isolated from sediments from the Chilika lagoon in India.

References 

Chromatiales
Bacteria described in 2015